{{DISPLAYTITLE:C20H27NO2}}
The molecular formula C20H27NO2 (molar mass: 313.43 g/mol, exact mass: 313.2042 u) may refer to:

 Oxilorphan (L-BC-2605)
 RTI-150

Molecular formulas